Alfred Vincent Pritchard (31 August 1920 – 9 May 1995) was an English professional footballer who played as an inside forward. He made appearances in the English Football League for Wrexham.

References

1920 births
1995 deaths
English footballers
Association football forwards
Chester City F.C. players
Millwall F.C. players
Dumbarton F.C. players
Wrexham A.F.C. players
Macclesfield Town F.C. players
English Football League players